Double Alibi is a 1937 British crime film directed by David MacDonald and starring Ernest Sefton, John Warwick and Linden Travers. It was made at Wembley Studios as a quota quickie by the British subsidiary of the Hollywood studio Fox.

Plot
The seemingly watertight alibi of a criminal is wrecked by the testimony of a woman connected with a rival gang.

Cast
 Ernest Sefton as Crayshaw 
 John Warwick as Charlie  
 Paul Neville as Dawkin 
 Linden Travers as Rita  
 Mavis Villiers as Miss Grant  
 Margaret Scudamore as Mrs. Havilland  
 Charles Eaton as Davidson  
 Eric Hales as Chauffeur

References

Bibliography
 Chibnall, Steve. Quota Quickies: The British of the British 'B' Film. British Film Institute, 2007.
 Low, Rachael. Filmmaking in 1930s Britain. George Allen & Unwin, 1985.
 Wood, Linda. British Films, 1927-1939. British Film Institute, 1986.

External links
 

1937 films
British crime drama films
1937 crime drama films
Films directed by David MacDonald (director)
Films shot at Wembley Studios
20th Century Fox films
Films with screenplays by Edward Dryhurst
British black-and-white films
1930s English-language films
1930s British films